Rare Beasts may refer to:

 Rare Beasts (novel), the first book in the Edgar & Ellen series for young adults by Charles Ogden
 Rare Beasts (film), a 2019 film